Udagamandalam taluk is a taluk of Nilgiris district of the Indian state of Tamil Nadu. The headquarters of the taluk is the town named Udagamandalam

Demographics
According to the 2011 census, the taluk of Udagamandalam had a population of 191,797 with 93,639  males and 98,158 females. There were 1048 women for every 1000 men. The taluk had a literacy rate of 76.44. Child population in the age group below 6 was 7,489 Males and 7,530 Females. The Udhagmandalam Taluk Is The most populus Taluk and Largest Urbanized area of The Nilagiri District

References 

Taluks of Nilgiris district